Matthew Donald Berninger (born February 13, 1971) is an American singer-songwriter, primarily known as the frontman and lyricist of indie rock band The National. In 2014, he also formed the EL VY project with Brent Knopf of Ramona Falls and Menomena and released the album Return to the Moon in November 2015. In May 2020, Berninger shared the title track from his solo debut album, Serpentine Prison, which was released in October 2020.

Berninger is known for his classic baritone voice.

Personal life
Berninger is a 1989 graduate of St. Xavier High School in Cincinnati, Ohio. He went on to study graphic design at the University of Cincinnati, where he met fellow band member Scott Devendorf in 1991. The two quickly became friends. Berninger quit a career in advertising in his thirties to start The National. He told The Telegraph: "I was doing well [in advertising]. But, once I entertained the thought that maybe I wouldn't ever have to go and sit in conference rooms with MasterCard to discuss web ads again, I couldn't shake it."

Berninger is married to Carin Besser, a one-time fiction editor for The New Yorker, who has often contributed to the band's songwriting ("Brainy" and "Ada" from the album Boxer) and backup vocals. Together with Hope Hall and Andreas Burgess, Besser also helped direct the music video for "Bloodbuzz Ohio". They have a daughter named Isla. Berninger has stated the song "Afraid of Everyone" was influenced by his anxiety about being a new father.

As a child, Berninger knew Neil Armstrong, who was a family friend of his uncle. Armstrong taught him to play pool. 

Berninger has two siblings: Tom (who directed Mistaken for Strangers, a film about The National) and Rachel.

In popular culture

In 2011, a portrait of Berninger was painted by British artist Joe Simpson; the painting was exhibited around the UK including a solo exhibition at The Royal Albert Hall.

In 2019, Berninger appeared in Between Two Ferns: The Movie.  Along with Phoebe Bridgers, they contributed the song "Walking on a String" to its soundtrack.

In 2020, Berninger was the subject of an episode of the fictional erotic podcast, Dirty Diana, produced by Demi Moore.

Discography

Albums

Singles

As lead artist

As featured artist

Other appearances

Musical theater

Plays 

 Cyrano (2018), with Carin Besser, Aaron Dessner, Bryce Dessner, and Erika Schmidt.

Notes

References

External links
 
 

American rock singers
American baritones
The National (band) members
St. Xavier High School (Ohio) alumni
1971 births
Living people
Musicians from Cincinnati
Singers from New York City
Musicians from Brooklyn
University of Cincinnati alumni
21st-century American singers